Legislative elections were held in South Korea on 20 May 1954. The result was a victory for Syngman Rhee's Liberal Party, which won 114 of the 203 seats. Voter turnout was 91.1%.

Results

Results by city/province

See also
Third National Assembly

References

Legislative elections in South Korea
South Korea
Legislative
Election and referendum articles with incomplete results